Parental Advisory (abbreviated PAL) is a warning label introduced by the Recording Industry Association of America (RIAA) in 1987 and adopted by the British Phonographic Industry (BPI) in 2011. The label is placed on audio recordings in recognition of inappropriate references, such as sexual content or profanity, with the intention of alerting parents of material potentially unsuitable for children. The label was first affixed on physical 33 1/3 rpm records, compact discs and cassette tapes, and it has been included on digital listings offered by online music stores. In PAL-region territories, some video games featuring licensed music were affixed with the label in the late 1990's and early 2000's.

Recordings with the Parental Advisory label are often released alongside a censored version that reduces or eliminates the objectionable material. Several retailers will distribute both versions of the product, occasionally with an increased price for the censored version, while some sellers offer the amended pressing as their main options and choose not to distribute the explicit counterpart. The label has been widely criticised as ineffective in limiting the inappropriate material to which young audiences are exposed.

Background 

Shortly after their formation in April 1985, the Parents Music Resource Center (PMRC) assembled a list of fifteen songs with deemed unsuitable content. Particular criticism was placed on "Darling Nikki" by Prince, after PMRC co-founder Mary "Tipper" Gore heard her 11-year-old daughter Karenna sing the lyrics, which included an explicit mention of masturbation. The Recording Industry Association of America (RIAA) responded by introducing an early version of their content warning label, although the PMRC was displeased and proposed that a music rating system structured like the Motion Picture Association of America film rating system be enacted. The RIAA alternatively suggested using a warning label reading "Parental Guidance: Explicit Lyrics", and after continued conflict between the organizations, the matter was discussed on September 19 during a hearing with the United States Senate Committee on Commerce, Science, and Transportation. Notable musicians, Frank Zappa, Dee Snider, and John Denver each testified at this hearing with strong opposition to PMRC's warning label system, and censorship in general. Approximately two months after the hearing, the organizations agreed on a settlement in which audio recordings were to either be affixed with a warning label reading "Explicit Lyrics: Parental Advisory" or have its lyrics attached on the backside of its packaging.

In 1990, the now standard black-and-white warning label design reading "Parental Advisory: Explicit Lyrics" was introduced and was to be placed on the bottom right-hand section of a given product. The first album to bear the "black and white" Parental Advisory label was the 1988 release of Straight Outta Compton by the gangsta-rap group N.W.A. By May 1992, approximately 225 records had been marked with the warning. In response to later hearings in the following years, it was reworded as "Parental Advisory: Explicit Content" in 1996. The system went unchanged until 2002, when record labels affiliated with Bertelsmann began including specific areas of concern including "strong language", "violent content", or "sexual content" on compact discs alongside the generic Parental Advisory label. The Parental Advisory label was first used on music streaming services and online music stores in 2011. That year, the British Phonographic Industry (BPI) revised its own music censorship policies to incorporate more prominent usage of the warning label.

Application 

The "Parental Advisory Label Program" in the United States and the "Parental Advisory Scheme" in the United Kingdom lack agreed-upon standards for using the warning label, although they provide guidelines for its recommended inclusion. Although a voluntary practice that is ultimately left to the discretion of record labels, the RIAA suggests that material with "strong language or depictions of violence, sex, or substance abuse to such an extent as to merit parental notification" be affixed with the Parental Advisory label. The BPI additionally requests that "racist, homophobic, misogynistic or other discriminatory language or behavior" be taken under consideration when determining the appropriateness of a record.

Physical copies of albums which have the label generally have it as a permanent part of the artwork, being printed with the rest of the cover. In some cases, the label is affixed as a sticker to the front of the case, which can be removed by putting the artwork in a different case. Audio recordings that include Parental Advisory labels in their original formats are generally released in censored versions that reduces or completely eliminates the questionable material. They are recognized as "clean" editions by the RIAA, and are left unlabeled in their revised formats. Target has sold both versions of a given record. Walmart and their affiliated properties are well known for only carrying censored versions of records; in one instance, the retailer refused to distribute Green Day's 2009 album 21st Century Breakdown because they were not given the "clean" copies that they requested. Online music stores, including the iTunes Store, generally have the Parental Advisory logo embedded into digital files. Digital retailers and streaming services such as iTunes, Spotify, and Amazon Music flag tracks as 'Explicit' if they have been identified as such.

Impact 

Since its introduction, the effectiveness of the Parental Advisory label has frequently been called into question. Jon Wiederhorn from MTV News suggested that artists benefited from the label and noted that younger customers interested in explicit content could more easily find it with a label attached. On behalf of Westword, Andy Thomas said that the label was purposeless on the grounds that a young customer "would get a copy of the album sooner or later from a friend or another lethargic record store clerk" like the cashier that sold him a labeled pressing of La Sexorcisto: Devil Music, Vol. 1 (1992) by White Zombie in his childhood. He noted that its intended reaction in parents was varied; his lax mother was indifferent towards the warning, while the stricter mother of his companion did not allow her child to listen to the record.

Danny Goldberg from Gold Village Entertainment opined that the Parental Advisory label offered minimal value other than "being a way for certain retailers like Wal-Mart to brand themselves as 'family friendly'"; he felt that children were successful in getting content they desired "even before the Internet", and believed that the label had little impact on sales figures. In contrast, the RIAA maintains that "it's not a PAL Notice that kids look for, it's the music". They stated that research they had gathered revealed that "kids put limited weight on lyrics in deciding which music they like, caring more about rhythm and melody" and implied that the label is not a deciding factor for a given purchase. Tom Cole from NPR commented that the Parental Advisory label has become "a fact of music-buying life", which made it difficult for current consumers to understand the widespread controversy that came about from its introduction. Greg Beato of Reason observed that by the 1990s, "A hip-hop album that didn't warrant a Tipper sticker was artistically suspect."

The label has become well known enough to be parodied. Guns N' Roses's 1991 albums Use Your Illusion I and Use Your Illusion II included a similarly-styled sticker saying "This album contains language which some listeners may find objectionable. They can F?!* off and buy something from the New Age section."

Edited counterparts 
It is fairly common for an album which received the Parental Advisory seal to be sold alongside an "edited" version which removes objectionable content, usually to the same level as a radio edit. The RIAA Guidelines however state "an Edited Version need not remove all potentially objectionable content from the sound recording." These albums are packaged nearly-identically to their explicit counterparts, usually with the only indicator being the lack of Parental Advisory seal, although if the artwork is deemed 'explicit' too, it will normally be censored. In the case of some albums, a black box reading "EDITED VERSION" is placed where the Parental Advisory seal would be. This was part of new guidelines introduced on April 1, 2002, which also included a label that featured "Edited Version Also Available" next to the Parental Advisory seal.

See also 

 Parents Music Resource Center
 Recording Industry Association of America
 MPAA film rating system (movie audience suitability: G/PG/PG-13/R/NC-17)

References 

Symbols introduced in 1985
Censorship in the United Kingdom
Censorship in the United States
Censorship of music
Media content ratings systems
Recording Industry Association of America
Self-censorship
Stickers